Stephen Kafoury (born October 4, 1941) is an American politician in the U.S. state of Oregon. He served in the Oregon House of Representatives and State Senate. He is a lawyer, having attended Lewis & Clark Law School, Whitman College, and Reed College.

References

Living people
1941 births
Politicians from Portland, Oregon
Reed College alumni
Lewis & Clark Law School alumni
Whitman College alumni
Democratic Party Oregon state senators
Oregon lawyers
Democratic Party members of the Oregon House of Representatives
20th-century American politicians